Timbuctoo is an unincorporated community in Westampton Township, Burlington County, New Jersey. Located along the Rancocas Creek, Timbuctoo was settled by formerly enslaved and free Black people, beginning in 1826. It includes Church St., Blue Jay Hill Road, and adjacent areas.  At its peak in the mid-nineteenth century, Timbuctoo had more than 125 residents, a school, an AME Zion Church, and a cemetery. The key remaining evidence of this community is the cemetery on Church Street, which was formerly the site of Zion Wesleyan Methodist Episcopal African Church.  Some current residents are descendants of early settlers.

History
Timbuctoo was founded by free Blacks and former slaves in 1826, in a region of New Jersey where the influence of Quakers was strong. Timbuctoo appeared on Burlington County maps as early 1849, and continues to appear on maps today.

At that time the leader of the community, nicknamed "King of Timbuctoo", was David Parker. Parkers had helped found the community.

In 1860, the Battle of Pine Swamp took place in Timbuctoo. It involved armed residents preventing the capture of Perry Simmons, an escaped slave living in Timbuctoo, by an infamous slave catcher named George Alberti.

The US Census identified the "Village of Timbuctoo" as a separate entity within Westampton Township for the first time in 1880, enumerating 108 residents and 29 households.

Today, the key remaining evidence of Timbuctoo's historical significance is a cemetery, well known for gravestones of United States Colored Troops who fought in the Civil War. However, there are also civilian gravestones, the oldest of which dates to 1847, thirteen years before the Civil War. A geophysical survey conducted in 2009 identified at least 59 unmarked graves.

Current residents and landowners include descendants of early settlers.

There is an active Timbuctoo Historical Society.

See also
History of slavery in New Jersey
Timbuctoo, New York

References

Further reading (most recent first)
 
 
 
 
 
 
 
  Reprinted from the Pennsylvania Freeman.

External links
The Timbuctoo, NJ, Historical Society

In Search of John Brown's Timbucto, Part I
In Search of John Brown's Timbucto, Part II

Westampton Township, New Jersey
African-American history of New Jersey
Unincorporated communities in Burlington County, New Jersey
Unincorporated communities in New Jersey
American slaves
Populated places established by African Americans